The Dry Age Boutique is a meat boutique based in Dubai, UAE that specializes in supplying selected cuts of beef, duck, fish, lamb and locally raised camel ouzi. It opened in January 2021. The new designer store like concept was created by Mirco Beutler also known as The Dry Ager Guy after spotting a lack of access to dry aged meats in the region. It claims to be the world's only dry aged boutique.

History

Mirco Beutler, a German hospitality entrepreneur, also known as the Dry-Ager Guy, founded The Dry Age Boutique in January 2021. The boutique was opened in Wafi Mall, Dubai. Dry aging involves the process of controlled decomposition of meat to make it more tender and flavorsome. It was founded as a part of the group company Mobile Gastro Konzepte, or MGK. During the Covid-19 lockdown, Mirco noticed that while restaurants were closed, he saw an increase in sales for his Dry Age Refrigerators for home use. This birthed the idea of The Dry Age Boutique. The Dry Age Boutique is a purveyor of haute couture meat. Meat grades include Wagyu, Angus in cuts like porterhouse, T-bone, tomahawk, striploin, rump, lamb, duck, and sushi-grade fish.

References 

Companies based in Dubai
Food companies